Mariano Ezequiel Arcioni (born 2 April 1970) is an Argentine politician who has served as the governor of Chubut Province since 1 November 2017. From 2015 to 2017, he was the province's vice governor under Mario Das Neves, whose office Arcioni took upon Das Neves's death on 31 October 2017.

Early life and education
Mariano Ezequiel Arcioni was born in Comodoro Rivadavia, in Chubut Province, on 2 April 1970. Arcioni finished high school at Comodoro Rivadavia's Liceo Militar General Roca. In 1995 he received his licenciatura in law from the Buenos Aires-based University of Belgrano, and later completed a degree from Universidad del Salvador to work as a scrivener.

Political career
Ahead of the 2015 general election, former governor Mario Das Neves chose Arcioni as his running mate in the race for the governorship of Chubut. The ticket, supported by the newly formed We Are All Chubut (Chusoto) party, won with 41.87% of the popular vote.

Arcioni was the first candidate in the Chusoto Chamber of Deputies list for the 2017 legislative election; the list was the most voted in the province with 33.23% of the vote and Arcioni was elected. However, a month before Arcioni could take office as National Deputy, Governor Das Neves died of complications from his colon cancer and Arcioni assumed the governorship on his stead.

Governorship
Arcioni was sworn in as governor on 1 November 2017. In the 2019 general election, Arcioni's Chusoto party formed an alliance with two other provincial parties and formed the Chubut al Frente ("Chubut Forward") alliance to back his candidacy to the governorship. His running mate was Puerto Madryn mayor Ricardo Sastre. On election day, the Chubut al Frente ticket won with 41.34% of the vote.

During Arcioni's second term, his administration has been subject to a number of controversies. In September 2019, the provincial government's inability to pay public sector workers their full wages led to protests that were forcibly quashed by provincial police forces. Throughout 2020 there were also protests against Arcioni's policy on surface mining in Chubut, seemingly backtracking on his campaign promises.

References

External links

Official website of the Governorship of Chubut (in Spanish)

1970 births
Living people
People from Comodoro Rivadavia
Governors of Chubut Province
21st-century Argentine politicians
Universidad del Salvador alumni